Daniel Chalifour (born 9 December 1971) is a Canadian Paralympic cyclist who competed at international elite competitions. He was a four-time Parapan American Games champion and a World bronze medalist. He has competed at the Paralympic Games three times, he has narrowly missed a bronze medal at the 2008 Summer Paralympics in the individual pursuit and 2012 Summer Paralympics in the road time trial respectively.

References

External links
 
 

1971 births
Living people
Paralympic cyclists of Canada
Cyclists at the 2008 Summer Paralympics
Cyclists at the 2012 Summer Paralympics
Cyclists at the 2016 Summer Paralympics
Medalists at the 2011 Parapan American Games
Medalists at the 2015 Parapan American Games